Tasmin McMahon (born 6 April 1993) is an Australian long-distance runner.

In 2013, she competed in the senior women's race at the 2013 IAAF World Cross Country Championships held in Bydgoszcz, Poland. She finished in 78th place.

References

External links 
 

Living people
1993 births
Place of birth missing (living people)
Australian female cross country runners
Australian female long-distance runners
21st-century Australian women